Bernard Onanga Itoua (born 7 September 1988) is a French footballer of Congolese descent who plays as a defender.

On 22 July 2013, he joined SV Elversberg on a three-year contract.

Honours
 Israel State Cup: 2013

References

1988 births
Living people
French footballers
French sportspeople of Democratic Republic of the Congo descent
Citizens of the Democratic Republic of the Congo through descent
Democratic Republic of the Congo footballers
Association football defenders
AJ Auxerre players
PFC Litex Lovech players
Hapoel Ramat Gan F.C. players
CS Gaz Metan Mediaș players
Ligue 1 players
First Professional Football League (Bulgaria) players
Israeli Premier League players
Liga I players
Expatriate footballers in Bulgaria
Expatriate footballers in Israel
Expatriate footballers in Romania
3. Liga players
Platanias F.C. players
Black French sportspeople